The election for the Hong Kong deputies to the 9th National People's Congress (NPC) was held on 8 December 1997. 36 Hong Kong deputies were elected by an electoral college. It was the first ever election for the Hong Kong deputies to the NPC since the establishment of the Hong Kong Special Administrative Region on 1 July 1997.

Background
Article 21 of the Hong Kong Basic Law stipulates:

Chinese citizens who are residents of the Hong Kong Special Administrative Region shall be entitled to participate in the management of state affairs according to law.

In accordance with the assigned number of seats and the selection method specified by the National People's Congress, the Chinese citizens among the residents of the Hong Kong Special Administrative Region shall locally elect deputies of the Region to the National People's Congress to participate in the work of the highest organ of state power.

Election result
The election was presided by Tung Chee-hwa, executive chairman of the 15-strong presidium and attended by Cao Zhi, secretary general of the National People's Congress Standing Committee (NPCSC). 36 of the 54 pre-elected candidates were elected with different backgrounds, including bankers, entrepreneurs, trade unionists, school headmasters, deans of university faculty, lawyers, doctors, professors, representatives from transport and communication industry and women, journalists, and new territories rural leaders.

Elected members (36) 

 Robin Chan
 Chan Wing-kee
 Cheng Yiu-tong
 Rita Fan Hsu Lai-tai
 Fei Fih
 Jiang Enzhu
 Kan Fook-yee
 Priscilla Lau Pui-king
 Lee Chark-tim
 Joseph Lee Chung-tak
 Allen Lee Peng-fei
 Li Lin-sang
 Li Weiting
 Liu Lit-for
 Lo Chung-hing
 Lo Suk-ching
 Luk Tak-kim
 Ma Lik
 Ng Ching-fai
 Ng Hong-mun
 Ngai Shiu-kit
 Sik Chi-wai
 Victor Sit Fung-shuen 
 Maria Tam Wai-chu
 Tsang Hin-chi
 Tsang Tak-sing
 Tso Wung-wai
 Carson Wen Ka-shuen
 Wong Kong-hon
 Peter Wong Man-kong
 Wong Po-yan
 Wilfred Wong Ying-wai
 Philip Wong Yu-hong
 Raymond Wu Wai-yung
 Yeung Yiu-chung
 Yuen Mo

Detailed results

References

1997 elections in China
1997 in Hong Kong
NPC